Baggini is a surname. Notable people with the surname include:

Claudio Baggini (1936–2015), Italian Roman Catholic bishop
Julian Baggini (born 1968), British philosopher, journalist, and author

See also
Baglini
Maggini (surname)